Juan Pablo Cantero (born September 19, 1982) is an Argentine professional basketball player for Unión de Santa Fe of the Liga Nacional de Básquet (LNB).

Professional career
In 2007–08, Cantero averaged 11.2 points and 3.2 assists per game with Juventud Sionista of the Argentine League. In 2008–09, he averaged 13.2 points and 4.1 assists per game with the same club.

National team career
On the heels of his successful 2008–09 season, Cantero was called up to the Argentine national basketball team for the first time at the 2009 Marchand Cup.  He also competed with the team at the FIBA Americas Championship 2009, providing depth off the bench in helping the team qualify for the 2010 FIBA World Championship.

Awards and accomplishments

Argentine national team
2009 FIBA Americas Championship: 
2010 South American Championship:

References

External links
FIBA profile
Latinbasket.com profile

1982 births
Living people
Argentine men's basketball players
Atenas basketball players
Club San Martín de Corrientes basketball players
Dinamo Sassari players
Italian men's basketball players
Juventud Sionista basketball players
Lanús basketball players
Libertad de Sunchales basketball players
Montecatiniterme Basketball players
People from Paraná, Entre Ríos
Point guards
Quimsa basketball players
S.L. Benfica basketball players
Sportspeople from Entre Ríos Province